Israel Viloria Freyte (born 13 November 1954) is a Colombian former footballer who played as a defender. He competed in the men's football tournament at the 1980 Summer Olympics.

References

1954 births
Living people
Colombian footballers
Association football defenders
Colombia international footballers
Olympic footballers of Colombia
Footballers at the 1980 Summer Olympics
Place of birth missing (living people)
Categoría Primera A players
Deportes Quindío footballers